Lores is a surname. Notable people with the surname include: 

Enrique Lores (born 1964/65), Spanish business executive
Horacio Lores, Argentine politician 
Julio Lores (1908–1947), Peruvian-Mexican football player
Marina Giral Lores (born 1990), Venezuelan tennis player